The 1995–96 USISL indoor season was an American soccer season run by the United Systems of Independent Soccer Leagues during the winter of 1995 to 1996.

Regular season
This season, the league allowed several teams to play exhibition games against league opponents.  Although these teams, which included the Connecticut Wolves, DFW Toros, Delaware Wizards, Jersey Dragons, Nashville Metros, Pennsylvania Freedom, Chattanooga Express and Washington Mustangs, were not officially in the league, the games were counted in the standings.

Games counted as four points for a win, three for a shootout win, one for a shootout loss and zero for a loss.  Only one game went to a shootout.  In it, the Knoxville Impact defeated the non-league Chattanooga Express.

Northeast Division

Mid-South Division

Central Division

Playoffs

Sizzlin’ Five
 Atlanta Magic 6, Dallas Lightning 4
 Baltimore Bays 7, Tulsa Roughnecks 6
 Dallas Lightning 10, Oklahoma City Slickers 7
 Baltimore Bays 12, Oklahoma City Slickers 10 (Overtime)
 Atlanta Magic 10, Tulsa Roughnecks 8

Final

MVP: Denison Cabral

Points leaders

Honors
 MVP: Denison Cabral
 Coach of the Year:  Kevin Healey

External links
The Year in American Soccer - 1996
United Soccer Leagues Statistical History, Part 2 (1994-1996)

USISL indoor seasons
Usisl
Usisl